Tutu was a minor Mesopotamian god. The meaning and origin of his name are uncertain. 

He was originally the tutelary god of Borsippa, near Babylon, and appears in the name of an ensi (governor) of the area from the Ur III period, Puzur-Tutu. References to worship him are also known from Kish and Sippar, and he seemingly appears in theophoric names from Larsa, Babylon and Dilbat, though it is uncertain if every instance of a divine name written as DU-DU or tu-tu in personal names refers to the same deity.  Tutu is still attested as a distinct deity in the role of the tutelary god of Borsippa during the reign of Hammurabi. 

As evidenced by god lists he was syncretised with Marduk in later periods, similar to Asalluhi, a god of exorcisms and son of Enki, the agricultural god Enbilulu, as well as an otherwise unknown deity named Šazu. In Enuma Elish, Tutu is one of the names bestowed upon Marduk, seemingly one connected with Babylon's role as a center of refurbishing and ritually reviving damaged divine statues. Tutu is also explained as a name of Marduk in an incantation from the Muššu'u series. A reference to Tutu, treated as a name of Marduk, can also be found in the so-called Bird Call Text:

According to Wilfred G. Lambert the use of Tutu as a name of Marduk ceased in the first millennium BCE, when it started to be used to refer to Nabu instead. However, according to Francesco Pomponio only a single neo-Assyrian text identifies Tutu as Nabu. Nabu nonetheless started to be regarded as the tutelary god of Borsippa in the first millennium BCE.

References

Bibliography 

Mesopotamian gods